On 17 November 2015, a suicide bombing occurred at a vegetable market in Yola, Adamawa State, eastern Nigeria. Over 30 people were killed and 80 others injured as traders in the city were closing for the day.

Jihadist group Boko Haram - whose insurgency began in 2009 and peaked in the mid-2010s - are suspected of being the perpetrators of this attack and many others in Adamawa State. These include a bombing at an internally displaced persons camp in Yola in September 2015, as well as those in Mubi in 2012, 2014, 2017 and 2018.

References

2015 murders in Nigeria
2010s massacres in Nigeria
Boko Haram bombings
Crime in Adamawa State
Islamic terrorist incidents in 2015
Marketplace attacks in Africa
Massacres in 2015
Massacres perpetrated by Boko Haram
November 2015 crimes in Africa
November 2015 events in Nigeria
Suicide bombings in 2015
Suicide bombings in Nigeria
Terrorist incidents in Nigeria in 2015